Oxford North was a federal electoral district represented in the House of Commons of Canada from 1867 to 1935. It was located in the province of Ontario. It was created by the British North America Act of 1867.

In 1882, the North Riding of the county of Oxford was defined to consist of the townships of East Nissouri, West Zorra, East Zorra, Blandford, South Easthope and North Easthope, the town of Woodstock, and the village of Embro.

In 1903, the riding was redefined to exclude the townships of South Easthope and North Easthope, and include the township of Blenheim.

In 1914, the riding was redefined to include the part of the village of Tavistock situated in the township of Zorra East.

The electoral district was abolished in 1933 when it was merged into Oxford riding.

Electoral history

|- 
  
|Liberal
|OLIVER, Thomas
|align="right"| acclaimed   
|}

|- 
  
|Liberal
|OLIVER, Thomas
|align="right"| acclaimed   
|}

|- 
  
|Liberal
|OLIVER, Thomas 
|align="right"| 1,866   
 
|Unknown
|WOOD, J.H. 
|align="right"|655   
|}

|- 
  
|Liberal
|OLIVER, Thomas 
|align="right"| 1,706   
 
|Unknown
|WOOD, 
|align="right"| 803   
|}

|-

  
|Liberal
|SUTHERLAND, James  
|align="right"| 1,835   
 
|Unknown
|PATTULO, G.R. 
|align="right"|1,465   
|}

|- 
  
|Liberal
|SUTHERLAND, James 
|align="right"|  1,469   
 
|Unknown
|TOWLE, Saml. 
|align="right"| 1,044   
 
|Unknown
|PATULLO, G.R.
|align="right"|999   
|}

|- 
  
|Liberal
|SUTHERLAND, James 
|align="right"| 2,083   
  
|Conservative
|THRALL, J.H. 
|align="right"| 847    
|}

|- 
  
|Liberal
|SUTHERLAND, James 
|align="right"| 2,544   
  
|Conservative
|KARN, D.W. 
|align="right"| 1,010    
|}

|- 
  
|Liberal
|SUTHERLAND, James
|align="right"| 2,811   
  
|Conservative
|KARN, D.W. 
|align="right"| 1,010    
|}

|- 
  
|Liberal
|SUTHERLAND, Hon. James
|align="right"| 2,717   
  
|Conservative
|WALLACE, James Gamble 
|align="right"| 1,115    
|}

|- 
  
|Liberal
|SUTHERLAND, Hon. J. 
|align="right"| acclaimed   
|}

|- 
  
|Liberal
|SUTHERLAND, Hon. James
|align="right"|  2,768   
  
|Conservative
|WALLACE, James G.
|align="right"|1,266    
|}

|- 
  
|Liberal
|SMITH, George 
|align="right"|2,845   
  
|Conservative
|WALLACE, J.G.
|align="right"| 2,507    
|}

|- 
  
|Liberal
|NESBITT, Edward Walter 
|align="right"| 2,675   
  
|Conservative
|QUINN, Daniel 
|align="right"|2,551    
|}

|- 
  
|Liberal
|NESBITT, Edward Walter
|align="right"| 2,898   
  
|Conservative
|WALLACE, James Gamble 
|align="right"| 2,603    
|}

|- 
  
|Government
|NESBITT, Edward Walter 
|align="right"| 3,836  
  
|Opposition
|SUTHERLAND, Donald Matheson 
|align="right"|3,074   
|}

|- 
  
|Liberal
|SINCLAIR, Duncan James  
|align="right"| 4,213   
  
|Conservative
|NESBITT, Edward Walter 
|align="right"| 4,053    

|}

|- 
  
|Conservative
|SUTHERLAND, Donald Matheson 
|align="right"| 6,243    
  
|Liberal
|SINCLAIR, Duncan James 
|align="right"|5,660   
|}

|- 
  
|Liberal
|ALLAN, Hugh 
|align="right"| 6,565   
  
|Conservative
|SUTHERLAND, Donald Matheson 
|align="right"| 6,193    
|}

|- 
  
|Conservative
|SUTHERLAND, Donald Matheson 
|align="right"| 7,217    
  
|Liberal
|ALLAN, Hugh  
|align="right"|  6,180   
|}

|- 
  
|Conservative
|SUTHERLAND, Hon. Donald Matheson 
|align="right"| acclaimed    
|}

See also 

 List of Canadian federal electoral districts
 Past Canadian electoral districts

References

External links 

 Website of the Parliament of Canada

Former federal electoral districts of Ontario